The Moritzbastei is the only remaining part of the ancient town fortifications of Leipzig. Today it is widely known as a cultural centre.

History of the building 
The Moritzbastei was built as a bastion in between 1551 and 1554 under the supervision of the mayor Hieronymus Lotter, who was also responsible for Leipzig's Altes Rathaus (old town hall) which is one of the most important Renaissance buildings in Germany. Elector Moritz of Saxony directed the reconstruction of the town fortifications of Leipzig after it became largely destroyed during the Smalkaldic War between German Emperor Charles V and the Smalkaldic League.

After being stormed for the first time in the Thirty Years War, the Moritzbastei lost its military function in the Seven Years' War. Henceforth it served as a store for trade goods and workplace for a bell founder and a book printer.

In the period 1796–1834, the first public school (1. Bürgerschule) was built over the basement of the Moritzbastei by architect Johann Carl Friedrich Dauthe. It was the first school in Germany without confessional segregated classes and was destroyed in 1943 during World War II.

From 1974 the Moritzbastei was rebuilt under the supervision of Leipzig University. More than 30,000 students were engaged in the reconstruction of the bastion, among them the future Chancellor of Germany, Angela Merkel.  From 1982 onward the Moritzbastei was the official student club of Leipzig University.

Moritzbastei as a student club 
In 1973 or 1974 students discovered the remains of the Moritzbastei and persuaded the university and city of Leipzig to allow it to be rebuilt. Subsequently, it was run by the Free German Youth as a venue for encounter and cultural events.

Since 1992 the Moritzbastei is no longer part of Leipzig University and became a legally independent (commercial) foundation. It is still linked to the university through its board of directors which is headed by the Rector of Leipzig University while a second board member has to be an elected student representative.

Moritzbastei since 1993 
Since 1993 the Moritzbastei has been run in the form of a GmbH under licence of the Moritzbastei foundation as a well known cultural centre. Its main purpose being to foster and sustain the student and academic culture in Leipzig.

The Board of Trustees, which oversees the work of the foundation without institutional subvention, consists of one representative of the city of Leipzig, the Free State of Saxony and the student body.

In recent years artists from all over the world have been guests of the Moritzbastei.

External links

 Moritzbastei
 Moritzbastei, in: Stadt Leipzig, Dezernat Stadtentwicklung und Bau (ed.), Leipzig-Innenstadt. Städtebaulicher Denkmalschutz 1994-2017, Beiträge zur Stadtentwicklung (Blaue Reihe), issue 61, pp. 30-31, in German

Buildings and structures in Leipzig
Tourist attractions in Leipzig